Midway Point is a residential locality in the local government area (LGA) of Sorell in the South-east LGA region of Tasmania. The 2016 census recorded a population of 2859 for the state suburb of Midway Point.
It is located on a small peninsula with Orielton Lagoon on its eastern side and Pittwater on its southern and western sides. The suburb meets the mid-way point of the Sorell Causeway from Hobart to Sorell, hence the name. Mcgees Bridge is connected to Midway Point on the Pittwater side.
The suburb lies close to Hobart International Airport and is approximately 21 km to Hobart via the Tasman Highway. In recent years Midway Point has become a popular commuter town for people working in Hobart.

History
Midway Point was gazetted as a locality in 1957.

Geography
The waters of Pittwater form the eastern, southern and western boundaries.

Road infrastructure
Route A3 (Tasman Highway) runs through the southern tip of the locality.

References

Sources
Google Maps

Towns in Tasmania
Southern Tasmania
Localities of Sorell Council